Gorgone  is a genus of moths in the family Erebidae. The genus was erected by Jacob Hübner in 1821.

Species

References

Calpinae